David Monroe Edwards (December 14, 1939 – December 6, 2016) was an American football linebacker in the National Football League (NFL) for the Dallas Cowboys. He played college football at Auburn University.

Early years
Edwards attended Abbeville High School. He was a two-way tackle and contributed to the team having a 9-1 record, while outscoring their opponents 281-19 in 1957. He received All-state honors as a senior. He also practiced basketball.

College career
He accepted football scholarship from Auburn University. 

Edwards was a two-way player who was used as an offensive end and defensive end. As a junior, he posted 6 receptions (tied for second on the team) for 74 yards and no touchdowns.

As a senior, he led the team with 25 receptions for 372 yards and 3 touchdowns. He was named to the All-SEC team. He played in the 1962 Senior Bowl, where Tom Landry coached the opposing team (North). 

In 1987, he was inducted into the Alabama Sports Hall of Fame.

Professional career
Edwards was selected by the Denver Broncos in the 25th round (194th overall) of the 1962 AFL Draft, but chose to sign with the NFL's Dallas Cowboys as a free agent in 1962. As a rookie, he started out as an offensive end on the taxi squad and was later converted to outside linebacker. He wasn't activated for any of the 14 games.

In 1963, he gained 25 lbs (from 205 to 230) and started 6 games, while replacing the injured Lee Roy Jordan and Harold Hays. In 1964, he began the season as the starter at strongside linebacker, until Chuck Howley passed him on the depth chart in the fourth game.

In 1965, he was named the starter at weakside linebacker. He would end up forming with Howley and Jordan, one of the best linebacking corps in NFL history as part of the 'Doomsday Defense'.

In 1967, he had 3 interceptions, including one returned for a touchdown against the Baltimore Colts. In 1969, Chuck Howley was moved to strongside linebacker and Edwards to weakside linebacker.

Referred to as "Fuzzy" by his teammates, Edwards' strength made him a difficult player to deal with against the run and he was also known to rarely make mistakes that could hurt the defense. He thrived against opposing tight ends, so much so, that then Oakland Raiders linebackers coach John Madden, instructed his linebackers to study Edwards' technique in stopping the run while jamming the tight end.

In 1970, he intercepted two passes against the Cleveland Browns, contributing to a 6-2 win, that was key for the team to make the playoffs.

On July 1, 1976, he announced his retirement and was replaced with Bob Breunig. Although overshadowed by Howley and Jordan, he was a key component in the Cowboys' defensive dominance during the late 1960s and early 1970s. Cowboys defensive assistant coach Ernie Stautner said "The best thing you can say about Edwards is that he's a pro. He plays while he's hurt and he still does an outstanding job. That's what a pro is".

Edwards missed only one game in his 12 NFL seasons, while starting 135 games. He recorded 30 turnovers, that included 13 interceptions and 16 fumbles recoveries (tied for second in franchise history). He helped the Cowboys win three NFC Championships and one Super Bowl. He played in Super Bowls V, VI and X.

Personal life
Edwards was a talented painter whose work was displayed in several shows. On December 6, 2016, Edwards died in his sleep the day he was scheduled to undergo tests for a heart condition at a Waco hospital. Edwards' son, Chris, planned on burying both of his parents' ashes together. However, his house was robbed on March 20, 2017, and his mother Gail's ashes were taken by the burglar.

References

External links
Alabama Sports Hall of Fame Profile

1939 births
2016 deaths
American football linebackers
Auburn Tigers football players
Dallas Cowboys players
People from Houston County, Alabama
Players of American football from Alabama